The 2006–07 Wessex Football League was the 21st season of the Wessex Football League. The league champions for the first time in their history were Gosport Borough, who were promoted to the Southern League. The three divisions were renamed Premier Division, Division One and Division Two.

There was some promotion between the three Wessex League divisions, but no relegation, and Division Two was disbanded at the end of the season, leaving the league with two divisions. Clubs with a specified level of facilities were promoted to Division One.

For sponsorship reasons, the league was known as the Sydenhams Wessex League.

League tables

Premier Division
The new Premier Division consisted of 20 clubs, reduced from 22 the previous season, after Winchester City, Thatcham Town and Andover were promoted to the Southern League, Portland United were demoted to the Dorset Premier League, and B.A.T. Sports and A.F.C. Newbury were demoted to the third tier after they suffered problems with their grounds. Four new clubs were promoted from the second tier:
Brading Town
Downton
Horndean
Ringwood Town

Division One
The new Division One consisted of 19 clubs, reduced from 22 the previous season, after Brading Town, Downton, Horndean and Ringwood Town were promoted to the top tier, Bishops Waltham Town and Whitchurch United were relegated to the third tier, and three new clubs joined:
Promoted from the third tier:
Laverstock & Ford
Verwood Town
also:
Warminster Town, joining from the Wiltshire League.

Division Two
The new Division Two consisted of 18 clubs, increased from 17 the previous season, after Laverstock & Ford and Verwood Town were promoted, and Micheldever and Netley Central Sports left the league. Five new clubs joined:
Demoted from the top tier:
A.F.C. Newbury
B.A.T. Sports
Relegated from the second tier:
Bishops Waltham Town
Whitchurch United
also:
Wellow, joining from the Southampton League.
Ordnance Survey were renamed Stoneham.

References

Wessex Football League seasons
9